The New Zealand women's national volleyball team represents New Zealand in international women's volleyball competitions and friendly matches.

It appeared at the Asian Women's Volleyball Championship 10 times.

References

External links
New Zealand Volleyball Federation

 

National women's volleyball teams
Volleyball
Volleyball in New Zealand